Janneman Nieuwoudt Malan (born 18 April 1996) is a South African cricketer. He made his international debut for the South Africa cricket team in February 2019.

Domestic and T20 career
Malan was included in the North West squad for the 2016 Africa T20 Cup. In August 2017, he was named in Bloem City Blazers' squad for the first season of the T20 Global League. However, in October 2017, Cricket South Africa initially postponed the tournament until November 2018, with it being cancelled soon after.

Malan was the leading run-scorer in the 2017–18 CSA Provincial One-Day Challenge tournament, with 500 runs in ten matches. He was also the leading run-scorer in the 2017–18 Sunfoil 3-Day Cup tournament, with 1,046 runs in ten matches.

In June 2018, Malan was named in the squad for the Cape Cobras team for the 2018–19 season. In September 2018, he was named in Western Province's squad for the 2018 Africa T20 Cup. He was the leading run-scorer for Western Province in the tournament, with 178 runs in four matches.

In October 2018, Malan was named in Cape Town Blitz's squad for the first edition of the Mzansi Super League T20 tournament. In September 2019, he was named in the squad for the Cape Town Blitz team for the 2019 Mzansi Super League tournament. In April 2021, he was named in Boland's squad, ahead of the 2021–22 cricket season in South Africa.

In April 2021, Malan was signed by Islamabad United to play in the rescheduled matches in the 2021 Pakistan Super League. In July 2022, he was signed by the Galle Gladiators for the third edition of the Lanka Premier League.

In September 2022 Malan was bought in the SA20 player auction by the Johannesburg Super Kings for the inaugural 2023 season.

International career
In February 2019, Malan was added to South Africa's Twenty20 International (T20I) squad for the series against Pakistan, after Quinton de Kock was ruled out of the fixtures due to an injury. He made his T20I debut for South Africa against Pakistan on 3 February 2019.

In January 2020, Malan was named in South Africa's One Day International (ODI) squad for their series against England. The following month, he was also named in South Africa's ODI squad for their series against Australia. He made his ODI debut for South Africa, against Australia, on 29 February 2020, but was dismissed for a golden duck. However, in his next match, Malan scored an unbeaten 129 runs, his maiden ODI century, as South Africa beat Australia by six wickets.

On 16 July 2021, against Ireland in the third ODI, Malan scored an unbeaten 177, the fourth-highest individual score by a batsman for South Africa in ODI cricket. He also shared a partnership of 225 runs with Quinton de Kock.

In the annual ICC Awards in January 2022, Malan was named in the ICC Men's ODI Team of the Year for the year 2021. He was also named as the ICC Emerging Men's Cricketer of the Year.

References

External links
 

1996 births
Living people
People from Mbombela
South African cricketers
South Africa One Day International cricketers
South Africa Twenty20 International cricketers
Boland cricketers
Cape Cobras cricketers
Cape Town Blitz cricketers
Lions cricketers
North West cricketers
Western Province cricketers